Yadrami  is a tehsil in the northern part of Karnataka, India. It is located in the Kalaburagi district.

Demographics
 India census, Yedrami had a population of 8103 with 4214 males and 3889 females.

See also
 Kalaburagi
 Districts of Karnataka

References

External links
 http://Gulbarga.nic.in/

Villages in Kalaburagi district